Czesław Marian Bieżanko (22 November 1895 in Kielce – 1986 in Pelotas, Brazil) was a Polish entomologist and recognized authority on South American butterflies.

He was professor of the College of Agronomy in the city of Pelotas (currently Universidade Federal de Pelotas and Doctor Honoris Causa of the Agricultural Academy. Bieżanko worked on the generic classification of Lepidoptera. At least one moth genus was named after him (Biezankoia Strand, 1936) and eleven insect species bear his name.

In 1964 he published a list of his publications (Biezanko C. M., 1964: Lista das publicacoes de C. M. Biezanko. Entomologia (Available publications), 8 pp., which does not include his last 
Genero e espécies dedicados a C. M. Biezanko. 1 pp. and Kilka slów o Francesco Stancaro. 4 pp.(all 1965).

References
Anonym 1986: [Biezanko, C. M.]  News Lep. Soc., Lawrence 1986 (5): 70	
Anonym 1987: [Biezanko, C. M.]  Butl. Soc. Catal. Lep., Barcelona 54:12	
Gardolinski, E. 1965: Ceslau Mário Biezanko, entomólogo de fama mundial. Curitiba : 16 p.+Schr.verz.

1895 births
1986 deaths
People from Kielce
People from Kielce Governorate
Polish entomologists
20th-century Polish zoologists